Achada Ponta is a settlement in the eastern part of the island of Santiago, Cape Verde. It is part of the municipality Santa Cruz. It is located near the east coast, 2 km southeast of Achada Fazenda and 5 kilometers southeast of Pedra Badejo. In 2010 its population was 403.

References

Villages and settlements in Santiago, Cape Verde
Santa Cruz, Cape Verde